"Diamond" is a song recorded by Canadian country music artist Julian Austin. It was released in 1997 as the second single from his debut album, What My Heart Already Knows. It peaked at number 3 on the RPM Country Tracks chart in January 1998.

Chart performance

Year-end charts

References

1997 songs
1997 singles
Julian Austin (musician) songs
Songs written by Julian Austin (musician)
ViK. Recordings singles